Amorpha canescens, known as leadplant, downy indigo bush, prairie shoestring, or buffalo bellows, is a small, perennial semi-shrub in the pea family (Fabaceae), native to North America. It has very small purple flowers with yellow stamens which are grouped in racemes. Depending on location, the flowers bloom from late June through mid-September. The compound leaves of this plant appear leaden (the reason for the common name "leadplant") due to their dense hairiness. This plant can be found growing in well-drained soils of prairies, bluffs, and open woodlands.

Description
The plant produces fruits in the form of hairy legumes each with one seed inside.

Uses
Leadplant is used for a variety of different purposes. Indigenous peoples such as the Oglala use the plant for medicinal purposes. Some indigenous tribes believed that the plant could aide in treating pinworms, eczema, rheumatism, neuralgia, open wounds, and cuts. The leaves of the plant were also used to make a tea and as a smoking mixture when dried, crushed and combined with buffalo fat. It is also provides many benefits to the ecosystems it is a part of, for example it provides valuable nutrition for grazing animals and helps prevent soil erosion. Leadplant may also be used in landscaping and gardening purposes due to its nitrogen fixing qualities and ability to help prevent erosion. Its nodulated roots are home to nitrogen fixing bacteria which help the plants grow.

Taxonomy
Amorpha canescens was described by Frederick Pursh in 1814. It falls under subfamily Papilionoideae of the family Fabaceae. The specific epithet "canescens" is a botanical Latin term meaning "becoming grey". There have been further delineation beyond species of Amorpha canescens into distinct variants (such as the A. canescens var. glabrata) based on the amount of hairs and color of the leaves, however this further distinction is not typically accepted due to the wide variation in pubescence of the plant.

Distribution and habitat
Amorpha canescens can be found in many locations throughout North America, ranging from southern parts of Canada south to Texas and New Mexico and spanning west to Montana and east to Michigan. Leadplant is typically found in dry prairie and savanna communities  Leadplant prefers drier, well-drained soil of many different textures including sandy, gravely, and rocky soils. Finding leadplant indicates minimal livestock grazing and well-kept land that is not overgrown or that has experienced regular fire.

References

External links

USDA Plants Profile for Amorpha canescens (leadplant)
Species account from USDA Forest Service Fire Effects Information System

canescens
Flora of the North-Central United States
Flora of the United States
Flora of the South-Central United States
Flora of the Great Plains (North America)
Flora of the Canadian Prairies
Plants described in 1814
Taxa named by Frederick Traugott Pursh
Plants used in traditional Native American medicine